Fulgencia Romay Martínez (born January 16, 1944) is a retired sprinter from Cuba. At the 1968 Summer Olympics she helped win a silver medal in 4 x 100 metres relay, the first Olympic medal ever won by a Cuban woman. At the 1972 Summer Olympics she won a bronze medal. She also won a silver medal in 200 metres at the 1971 Pan American Games.

References

Cuban female sprinters
1944 births
Living people
Athletes (track and field) at the 1968 Summer Olympics
Athletes (track and field) at the 1972 Summer Olympics
Athletes (track and field) at the 1976 Summer Olympics
Athletes (track and field) at the 1963 Pan American Games
Athletes (track and field) at the 1971 Pan American Games
Athletes (track and field) at the 1975 Pan American Games
Olympic athletes of Cuba
Olympic silver medalists for Cuba
Olympic bronze medalists for Cuba
Medalists at the 1968 Summer Olympics
Medalists at the 1972 Summer Olympics
Olympic silver medalists in athletics (track and field)
Olympic bronze medalists in athletics (track and field)
Pan American Games medalists in athletics (track and field)
Pan American Games silver medalists for Cuba
Central American and Caribbean Games medalists in athletics
Central American and Caribbean Games gold medalists for Cuba
Central American and Caribbean Games silver medalists for Cuba
Central American and Caribbean Games bronze medalists for Cuba
Competitors at the 1962 Central American and Caribbean Games
Competitors at the 1966 Central American and Caribbean Games
Competitors at the 1970 Central American and Caribbean Games
Medalists at the 1963 Pan American Games
Medalists at the 1971 Pan American Games
Medalists at the 1975 Pan American Games
Olympic female sprinters
Universiade medalists in athletics (track and field)
Universiade bronze medalists for Cuba
20th-century Cuban women
21st-century Cuban women